Taste of Fear is a 1961 British thriller film directed by Seth Holt. The film stars Susan Strasberg, Ronald Lewis, Ann Todd, and Christopher Lee in a supporting role. It was released in the United States as Scream of Fear.

Plot
After the suicide of her best friend, wheelchair-user heiress Penny Appleby (Susan Strasberg) arrives at her estranged father's estate on the French Riviera. Her stepmother (Ann Todd), whom Penny has only just met, informs her that the father has been called away on business. She cannot say when he will return or why he left when he was expecting Penny's arrival. Although the stepmother has made the place comfortable for Penny, the young woman does not trust her. That night she believes she sees her father's corpse in the guest cottage. When others respond to her hysterical screams, the corpse is not there. The stepmother tries to convince Penny that her recent tragedy is causing her to hallucinate, and the family doctor (Christopher Lee) cites Penny's history of neurotic behaviour to support that view.

The family chauffeur (Ronald Lewis) meets Penny privately to say he believes Penny did see something unusual, even if not a corpse. He offers to help her investigate. As they proceed, Penny begins to wonder if he is really an ally or if he is leading her away from the truth. When a police detective begins his own investigation, he suspects that Penny may have secrets of her own.

Cast
 Susan Strasberg as Penny Appleby
 Ronald Lewis as Robert
 Ann Todd as Jane Appleby
 Christopher Lee as Doctor Gerrard
 John Serret as Inspector Legrand
 Leonard Sachs as Spratt
 Anne Blake as Marie
 Fred Johnson as Father

Production
Jimmy Sangster stated that he originally wrote the film for Sidney Box who assigned him to produce it. According to Sangster, Box became ill and stopped his work temporarily, leading his work to be taken over by his brother-in-law Peter Rogers, who was busy working on the Carry On series. Sangster then bought the film back from Rogers and sold it to Michael Carreras on the condition that Sangster would be allowed to produce. Filming occurred at Bray Studios in Berkshire. Filming started 24 October 1960.

Release
Taste of Fear was distributed in the United Kingdom on June 5, 1961 with an 82 minute running time. It was later distributed in the United States with an 81 minute running time on August 22, 1961 under the title Scream of Fear. The film was a success in the United Kingdom and the United States and was very popular in Europe, being one of Hammer's most profitable productions which led to a cycle of similar films.

In March 2013, it was announced that the film will be remade for Sony, and directed by Juan Antonio Bayona, whose previous credits include the acclaimed 2007 Spanish horror film, The Orphanage.

Legacy
Christopher Lee later stated that the film "was the best film that I was in that Hammer ever made... [...] It had the best director, the best cast and the best story." Ann Todd contradicted him, saying that she thought "it was a terrible film. I didn't like my part, and I found Susan Strasberg impossible to work with-all that 'Method' stuff."

An article in the Blacklist later argued the film still had the capacity to surprise. "We’re often told it’s hard to shock audiences these days because they’ve seen so much and society is so tolerant, but every society has things which aren’t normally seen — and one of them is still a 52 year old woman with wrinkles making out with a handsome 33 year old man on screen."

See also
List of Hammer films

References

Sources

External links 
 
 
 
 

1961 films
1960s thriller films
British black-and-white films
British thriller films
Films about paraplegics or quadriplegics
Films directed by Seth Holt
Films scored by Clifton Parker
Films set in France
Films set on the French Riviera
Films shot at Associated British Studios
Films shot at Bray Studios
Hammer Film Productions films
Films with screenplays by Jimmy Sangster
Films produced by Jimmy Sangster
1960s English-language films
1960s British films